Ali Muhsin Al-Barwani (13 January 1919 in Stone Town – 20 March 2006 in Muscat, Oman) was a Zanzibari politician and diplomat under the Sultanate of Zanzibar. He was the only Arab foreign minister of an independent Zanzibar before the establishment of the People's Republic of Zanzibar. When his government was overthrown in January 1964 Barwani was held in detention centers across Tanzania until his release in 1974, when he fled to Kenya as a refugee. After obtaining refugee status, Barwani moved to Cairo then back to Kenya then to Dubai in the  United Arab Emirates. In the UAE, Barwani translated the Qur'an into  Swahili (Swahili kiUnguja) Qur'an for which he is most prominently known.

During the years of the Al Said dynasty based in Zanzibar the Barwani were involved in the development of the east African coast from Barawa (in the north, in what was to become Italian Somaliland) to Lindi, in the south, a town founded by Sheikh Ali's maternal grandfather (in what was to become German East Africa). His maternal grandmother was related to the wa Mtwapa, one of the twelve miji (or taifa 'groups') comprising Swahili Mombasa. Ali was an outstanding student and in 1937, aged eighteen, he passed effortlessly from government secondary school in Zanzibar to university at Makerere in Kampala.

His admission was unusual in that he gained university entrance on the strength of a phone-call from his headmaster (L.W. Hollingsworth) to the Director of Education, Zanzibar - no examination required ! At Makerere, then the only institution for higher learning in East Africa, Ali read agriculture. A fellow student at that time was Julius Nyerere who, as President of Tanganyika, was to play a significant role in Sheikh Ali's life some 20 years later. In 1942, on his return to Zanzibar, he was employed by the Protectorate government as an assistant agricultural officer at Mangapwani.

Two years later he married Bi. Azza binti Muhammad Seif Al-Busa'idi – marriage made in heaven it would seem. After the second World War (1939-1945) Ali developed a taste for politics which manifested itself in two ways. First, for some fifteen years, he edited the newspaper Mwongozi and, secondly, he joined the Zanzibar Nationalist Party.

One of Ali's ambitions was to transform Zanzibar into a non-racial society and, to this end, he promoted the implementation of a common electoral roll. After the Zanzibar Sultanate attained internal self-government in 1961 Sheikh Ali was appointed Minister of Education.

In this post he ensured that married female teachers were eligible for maternity leave and maternity pay - his innovation being soon adopted by other ministries. Subsequent cabinet posts were Minister of the Interior and Minister for Foreign Affairs and Commerce. 

In March and April 1962 Sheikh Ali visited London for the Kenya coastal Strip (the Kenya Protectorate) conference at Lancaster House, which closed without any firm decision being taken on the integration of the coastal strip (Mwambao) with the rest of Kenya. Sheikh Ali attended as one of eight
elected members from Zanzibar.

On 12 January 1964 a revolution brought the Al Said dynasty in Zanzibar (established in the 1830s) to a bloody and sudden end Sheikh Ali (with others) was detained for six months at Kilimani, Zanzibar Stone Town, before being flown to the mainland Tanganyika. Here his detention continued at Keko, Ukonga Dar es Salaam, Dodoma, Mwanza and Bukoba for a period of ten years and four months, but he was never charged with any offence. In May 1974 he was released, but his application for a Tanzanian passport was refused.

Sheikh Ali then determined to enter neighbouring Kenya illicitly. His point of entry was Vanga, and thence he traveled to Nairobi via Mombasa where he applied for and obtained refugee status. 

He was fated never to see Zanzibar again. Perhaps the authorities in both revolutionary Zanzibar and in Tanganyika (subsequently the United Republic of Tanzania) saw in Sheikh Ali's intellect and ability a potential threat to their leadership. Whether this was so or not it is now idle to speculate. Once his papers were in order Sheikh Ali traveled to Cairo.

After a stay of several years he returned to Kenya, this time lawfully. For a while he lived in Ganjoni, Mombasa, and then at Mtongwe. From there Sheikh Ali and his family moved to Dubai, in the United Arab Emirates. Here, in 1989 his beloved companion for life died, after almost half a century of marriage.

It was the cruelest of blows. At about this time began the affliction of failing eyesight. Notwithstanding, Sheikh Ali was able to complete and publish his magnum opus, his interpretation of the Quran into the Swahili of Zanzibar kiUnguja. This monumental work (the first impression appeared in two volumes,  1995; the second in one volume, 2000) owes everything to the Swahili of Sheikh Ali's parents and nothing to the standardized language of Europeans and others.

This was truly a labour of love, with beauty and elegance evident in virtually every verse. In 1997 came Ruwaza Njema ('The Perfect Pattern'), a long poem in praise of the Prophet Muhammad, with exemplary annotations at the end of each chapter. The years which remained to him were spent in Muscat, Sultanate of Oman, the birthplace of his wife's parents. Had there been no revolution in Zanzibar and had the Al Said dynasty not been terminated it is conceivable that Sheikh Ali might have attained the highest office in the land, but it was not to be.

Sheikh Ali's claim to fame lies rather less in the domain of politics, and rather more in the pages of his Swahili Quran. He was not the first to attempt such a task notable predecessors were  Sheikh Amin bin Ali al-Mazrui and Sheikh Abdullah Saleh al-Farsy but  it is Sheikh Ali's text which best displays the Swahili language in all its glory.

Moreover, it was a task undertaken not lightly, and carried to its conclusion at a time of great personal distress. This, his memorial, will surely endure for as long as the language and the literature of the Swahili-speaking peoples survive. Sheikh Ali died in Muscat on Monday 20 March 2006, in his eighty-sixth year.

Education
Barwani graduated from Makerere University in Kampala, Uganda, in 1942.

External links
 Online Quran Project includes the Qur'an translation by Ali Muhsin Al-Barwani.
 Obituary at coastweek.com 
 Qur'ani Tukufu
 Holy Qur'an Swahili Translation

1919 births
2006 deaths
Zanzibari politicians
Zanzibari diplomats
Government ministers of Zanzibar
Tanzanian expatriates in the United Arab Emirates
Quran translators
Translators to Swahili
Translators from Arabic
Tanzanian people of Omani descent
20th-century translators
Expatriates in Uganda
Tanzanian expatriates in Kenya
Tanzanian expatriates in Egypt